Body Heat is  a 1981 film by Lawrence Kasdan.

Body Heat  may also refer to:
Thermoregulation, the ability of an organism to keep its body temperature within certain boundaries
Body Heat (Blue System album)
Body Heat (Quincy Jones album)
"Bodyheat", a 1976 song by James Brown
Bodyheat (album), a James Brown album containing the song
 "Body Heat", a 1989 single by Australian rock band Roxus
 "Body Heat", a 2015 song by American singer Selena Gomez from her second studio album Revival